Head Sport GmbH is an American-Austrian manufacturing company headquartered in Kennelbach. It owns the American tennis racket brand Head. Head GmbH is a group that includes several previously independent companies, including the original "Head Ski Company" (founded in the United States in 1950); Tyrolia, an Austrian ski-equipment manufacturer; and Mares, an Italian manufacturer of diving equipment.

Head currently produces a wide range of products for skiing, snowboarding, swimming, tennis and other racket sports. Head Ski Company produced one of the first successful metal-wood composite downhill skis, the Head Standard, and one of the first oversized metal tennis rackets.

History 
Head Sport GmbH was founded in Baltimore, Maryland, United States, in 1950 by aeronautical engineer Howard Head, after he took a ski trip and was astonished to see his skis were made of wood in an era when metals and plastics were replacing wood in many product designs. Head worked at the Glenn L. Martin Company where they used a form of aluminum and plastic laminate to build the fuselages of aircraft, and he felt the same material would make an ideal ski. After two years of constantly breaking skis, by the winter of 1950 they had a design that not only stayed together, but made turning dramatically easier.

The Head Standard would rapidly grow in sales through the 1950s, until it and other Head designs were capturing over 50% of the US market during the 1960s, making them the leading ski manufacturer in the U.S. and the UK. Head resisted the change to fibreglass construction. In 1967, Howard Head hired Harold Seigle as company president, and became the Chairman of the Board and CEO. Bored of the results, in 1969 Head sold the company to the AMF, and took up tennis. He later bought a controlling interest in Prince Sports.

In the late 1960s, a tennis division was created when Howard Head figured out a way of strengthening the tennis racket by introducing the aluminium frame. The idea became a success and was first introduced in the 1969 US Open. After Howard Head's departure, one of the tennis players that Head sponsored, Arthur Ashe, won Wimbledon, defeating favored Jimmy Connors in 1975. Also during the 1970s, Head acquired a diving manufacturer, Mares, and a ski binding company, Tyrolia. While under AMF ownership, Head manufactured tennis racquets in Boulder, Colorado, and Kennelbach, Austria. Also in 1969, Head signed Olympic champion ski racer Jean-Claude Killy to endorse a new metal and fiberglass ski, the Killy 800. Head subsequently developed a product line of Killy skis.

In 1985, Minneapolis-based Minstar Inc. acquired Head through hostile takeover of AMF. Two years later, Head started making athletic footwear, and introduced the "Radial Tennis Shoes". The following year, Head opened a new plant in Austria in order to produce more tennis rackets. In 1989, management bought out Head, Tyrolia, and Mares, to form HTM. The takeover was backed by private equity firm Freeman Spogli & Co. In 1993, HTM was sold to tobacco conglomerate Austria Tabak. Johan Eliasch, the current chairman, took over the company in 1995, which in 2014 was a Netherlands Antilles corporation.

For a short time, around 1995, Head offered golf clubs as well.

In 1997, Head created the first titanium and graphite tennis racket. Over the next two years, Head acquired three more companies, DACOR, BLAX, and Penn Racquet Sports. Penn tennis balls are used in many high-profile tournaments worldwide, while Penn racquetballs are the official balls of the IRT and U.S. Racquetball Association. Penn once produced tennis balls and racquetballs in Phoenix, Arizona. In March 2009, Head shut down the Penn ball manufacturing factory. Now all tennis balls are produced in China.

Head also licenses its brand to makers of clothing apparel (including shoes), accessories, bicycles, skates, watches, balls, fitness Equipment and drinks.

Head proved to be successful in 2012, with three Major winners during the year: Novak Djokovic at the Australian Open, Maria Sharapova at the French Open and Andy Murray at the US Open.

In 2019, it was reported that Head purchased ASE assets. ASE is the owner of Fuji Bikes, Breezer Bikes, SE Bikes, Kestrel Bikes, Tuesday Bikes, PHAT Bikes, Oval, Performance Bicycle Stores and Nashbar.  On January 22, 2019 it was reported that Head Sports backed out of the deal to buy ASE.

Graphene 
Head started integrating graphene into their rackets in 2013.

Products 
Current range of products by Head includes:

Sponsorships 
Some of the athletes sponsored by Head are:

 Anna Fenninger
 Lara Gut
 Kjetil Jansrud
 Ted Ligety
 Alexis Pinturault
 Cyprien Richard
 Aksel Lund Svindal

Tennis sponsorships

Men

  Novak Djokovic
  Diego Schwartzman
  Alexei Popyrin
  Bernard Tomic
  Marin Čilić
  Jonas Forejtek
  Fernando Verdasco
  Alejandro Davidovich Fokina
  Emil Ruusuvuori
  Richard Gasquet
  Gilles Simon
  Andy Murray
  Jan-Lennard Struff
  Alexander Zverev
  Matteo Berrettini
  Jannik Sinner
  Lorenzo Musetti
  Kwon Soon-woo
  Treat Huey
  Pablo Cuevas
  Taylor Fritz
  Andrey Rublev
  Aslan Karatsev
  Dominik Koepfer

Women

  Nadia Podoroska
  Samantha Stosur
  Elise Mertens (to 2022)
  Alison Van Uytvanck
  Victoria Azarenka (to 2012)
  Aliaksandra Sasnovich
  Tsvetana Pironkova
  Bianca Andreescu
  Barbora Krejčíková
  Karolína Muchová
  Danka Kovinić
  Anna Blinkova
  Svetlana Kuznetsova
  Jil Teichmann
  Danielle Collins (to 2020)
  Coco Gauff
  Christina McHale
  Sloane Stephens

Retired players

  Mark Philippoussis
  Ashleigh Barty
  Barbara Schett
  Goran Ivanišević
  Tomáš Berdych
  Anabel Medina Garrigues
  Mansour Bahrami
  Cédric Pioline
  Nathalie Dechy
  Amélie Mauresmo
  Marc-Kevin Goellner
  Steffi Graf
  Anna-Lena Grönefeld
  Roberta Vinci
  Anastasia Myskina
  Marat Safin
  Maria Sharapova
  Mikhail Youzhny
  Patty Schnyder
  Robin Söderling
  Gustavo Kuerten
  Andre Agassi
  John McEnroe

See also 
 Shock stop, invention by the firm

References

External links

 

Tennis equipment manufacturers
Ski equipment manufacturers
Sportswear brands
Manufacturing companies based in Amsterdam
Manufacturing companies established in 1950
1950 establishments in Maryland
Swimwear manufacturers